Milap ( is a 1937 Indian Hindi/Urdu-language social drama film directed by A. R. Kardar. Produced under the Moti Mahal Pictures banner, it had music composed by K. C. Dey. Milap was a big success for the actress Rampyari.

The film was famous for being the first to show the prototype of a "vamp" in Indian cinema. Rampyari was shown wearing "an off-shoulder dress" and using a cigarette-holder, with the intent of seducing the hero Prithviraj Kapoor. The scene was later used by Raj Kapoor on Nadira in his film Shree 420 (1955) for the song "Mud Mud Ke Na Dekh".

The co-stars included M. Ismail, Yakub, Bimla Kumari, Dev Bala and Anees Khatoon.

Cast
 Prithviraj Kapoor
 Rampyari
 Indira Devi
 Mazhar Khan
 M. Ismail
 Yakub
 Bimla Kumari
 Anees Khatoon
 Devbala

Soundtrack
Akbar Khan (Durrani) Peshawri sang the popular number "Pila Raha Hai Toh Kuchh Lutf-e-Mai Badha Ke Pila". The music director was K. C. Dey.

Song List

References

External links
 

1937 films
1930s Hindi-language films
Films directed by A. R. Kardar
Indian black-and-white films